Summit Health is a for-profit, multispecialty medical practice headquartered in Berkeley Heights, New Jersey. The company is a result of a merger between Summit Medical Group and CityMD.

Summit Health is led by Chairman and CEO Jeffrey Le Benger, MD. In 2016, Le Benger was named #8 in the "NJBiz Health Care Power 50 list" – a publicized ranking of the leaders of New Jersey healthcare organizations, state policymakers and legislators.

History

Founders 
Summit Health traces its beginnings to October 1919, when co-founders William H. Lawrence, MD, and Maynard G. Bensley, MD established the company as Summit Medical Group in Summit, New Jersey. The two had met in the United States Army's World War I Ambulance Company 33, which Lawrence had organized, and which was later headed by Bensley. Lawrence attained a rank of Major, and Bensley attained the rank of Captain, in their participation in the ambulance company. Lawrence was in charge of the unit for a year, until he became ill in 1918, and Bensley then led it until it was disbanded a year later. The teamwork they experienced as army medical staff led them to try to replicate the idea in civilian life, and they founded the first team medicine practice in New Jersey in 1919. In 1931, they expanded into a group practice with a total of seven or eight doctors. While the original partnership "team" was known as Summit Health, the group practice was organized as the Lawrence-Bensley Medical Group, but eventually readopted the Summit name.

Lawrence enrolled in Columbia University's College of Physicians and Surgeons at the age of 15. He became a surgeon, founder of Overlook Hospital, and a resident of the Murray Hill section of Bernardsville.

Bensley, was originally from Hamburg, New York (born in Buffalo), the son of a local banker, George A. Bensley, and Margaret Woodruff. He attended University of Michigan and the University of Buffalo,  from which he received his medical degree in 1910. He started practicing medicine as a surgeon and general practitioner, but became an obstetrician in 1931. He lived in Summit and Maplewood, New Jersey. Bensley was chief of Staff at Overlook for many years. He died March 23, 1985, and was 95 years old. His wife, Helen Flemer Plunkett, who performed a community medicine auxiliary role, died July 5, 2007, age 108,  They were married in 1938.

Growth 
In 1950, Lawrence and Bensley expanded to a second location at 120 Summit Avenue in Summit, New Jersey. In 2003, Summit Medical Group signed a lease for a 42-acre office complex in Berkeley Heights, New Jersey that formerly housed the D&B Corporation.

In 2013, Summit Medical Group established the Summit Medical Group Foundation, a nonprofit organization operating in the segments of health promotion, medical research and medical education.

In 2014, Summit Medical Group launched a new management company, Summit Health Management (SHM). SHM offers consulting and management services to physician practices in the United States.

In 2019, Summit Medical Group merged with CityMD.

In 2021, the company was renamed to Summit Health, and Summit Medical Group Foundation was subsequently renamed to Summit Health Cares.

As of April 2022, Summit Health includes more than 200 satellite offices across northern New Jersey and New York.

In November 2022, Walgreens Boots Alliance's primary-care-center subsidiary, Village Practice Management agreed to buy Summit Health in a deal worth nearly $9billion including debt.

Research and care management

 In 2002, Summit Health began a multi-year project to implement practice-wide electronic health records (EHR). By 2007, it was completely paperless.
 Summit Health developed a "Diabetes Live Well Program," which has helped get 19% of its diabetes patients A1c levels under control – a figure that compared favorably with US national average A1c controls of 9% In June 2008, the American Diabetes Association (ADA) awarded it an Education Recognition Certificate for the diabetes program 
 In September 2009, Summit Health released "Coordination of Multidisciplinary Resources for Vaccination of Egg-allergic Individuals During an H1N1 (Novel) Influenza Pandemic," a study showing the benefits of H1N1 immunization and the safety of vaccines for egg-allergic patients.
 In January 2016, Health joined Trinity Health Accountable Care Organization (ACO). Trinity Health ACO is one of 21 ACOs selected to participate in the Next Generation ACO, under the Center for Medicare and Medicaid Innovation (CMMI), a division of the Centers for Medicare and Medicaid Services (CMS). This model builds on experience from the Pioneer ACO Model and the Medicare Shared Savings Programs and allows ACOs to assume higher levels of financial risk and reward.
 In March 2016, Summit Health joined forces with other health care organizations in the American Medical Group Foundation’s "Diabetes: Together 2 Goal®" campaign. The goal of this three-year campaign is to improve care and outcomes for patients with type 2 diabetes.
 Summit Health has participated in clinical research for allergy, asthma, diabetes, hypercholesterolemia, lupus, osteoporosis, rheumatoid arthritis, sinus disease and oncology. Its oncology trials include studies for breast cancer, colorectal cancer, leukemia, lung cancer, lymphoma, and prostate cancer.

Locations 
Among its 67, Summit Health has four main operational locations:

 Berkeley Heights, New Jersey. (Headquarters). Its 250,000 square-foot main campus at 1 Diamond Hill Road offers Allergy / Immunology; Acupuncture; Ambulatory Surgery; Anesthesiology; Audiology; Bariatric (Weight Loss) Surgery; Breast Care Center; Breast Surgery; Cardiology; Cancer Services; Chiropractic Medicine; Colorectal Surgery; Dermatology; Diabetes Live Well Program; Ear Specialty Center; Ear, Nose, and Throat (ENT); Endocrinology; Extensivist Medicine; Family Medicine; Gastroenterology; General Surgery; Genetic Counseling Center; Geriatric Services; Hand Surgery; Hand Therapy; Head and Neck Surgery; Imaging/Radiology; Infusion Center; Internal Medicine; COLA-approved Laboratory; Massage Therapy; Medical Research; Mohs Micrographic Surgery; Nephrology; Neurology; Neurosurgery; Nutrition Services; Obstetrics/Gynecology; Oncology/Hematology; Ophthalmology; Orthopedics; Pain Management; Pediatrics/Adolescent Medicine; Pediatrics After Hours; Pediatric Pulmonology; Physiatry; Physical Therapy; Plastic Surgery; Podiatry; Pulmonology; Rheumatology; Speech Therapy; Spine Surgery Center; Sports Medicine; Surgical Oncology; Travel Medicine and Infectious Diseases; Urgent Care Center; Urology; Vascular Screenings; Vascular Surgery; Wellness and Complementary Medicine; Vein Center; and a Walgreens Pharmacy.
 Florham Park, New Jersey. Its 100,000 square-foot campus at 140 Park Avenue offers Allergy/Immunology; Ambulatory Surgery; Audiology; Breast Surgery; Cancer Services; Cardiology; Chiropractic Medicine; Colorectal Surgery; Ear, Nose, and Throat (ENT); Gastroenterology; General Surgery; Geriatric Services; Hand Surgery; Hand Therapy; Head and Neck Surgery; Imaging/Radiology; Internal Medicine; Laboratory; Orthopedics; Pain Management; Pediatric Pulmonology; Physiatry; Physical Therapy; Pulmonology; Rheumatology; Speech Therapy; Spine Surgery Center; Sports Medicine; Summit Atlantic Surgery Center, an outpatient surgery center, which is a joint venture between Summit Health and Atlantic Health System; Surgical Oncology; Urgent Care Center; Vascular Screenings; and Vascular Surgery.
 Livingston, New Jersey. Its 50,000 square-foot medical facility at 75 E. Northfield Road offers Allergy/Immunology; Audiology; Breast Surgery; Cardiology; Colorectal Surgery; Dermatology; Ear, Nose, and Throat (ENT); Endocrinology; Family Medicine; Gastroenterology; General Surgery; Gynecology; Imaging/Radiology; Internal Medicine; Laboratory; Neurology; Nutrition Services; Obstetrics/Gynecology; Pediatrics/Adolescent Medicine; Pediatrics After Hours; Pediatric Pulmonology; Plastic Surgery; Podiatry; Pulmonology; Rheumatology; Speech Therapy; and Urgent Care Center.
 Westfield, New Jersey. Its 32,000 square-foot medical facility offers Allergy/Immunology; Audiology; Cancer Services; Ear, Nose, and Throat (ENT); Hand Surgery; Hand Therapy; Head and Neck Surgery; Imaging/Radiology; COLA-approved Laboratory; Orthopedics; Pain Management; Pediatrics After Hours; Physiatry; Physical Therapy; Podiatry; Radiology; Speech Therapy; Sports Medicine; Surgical Oncology and Urgent Care Center.

Affiliations and partnerships

Summit Health has additional affiliations and partnerships with:

 Chilton Medical Center
 Clara Maass Medical Center
 Hackensack University Medical Center
 Hoboken University Medical Center
 Morristown Medical Center
 NewYork–Presbyterian Hospital
 Overlook Medical Center
 Robert Wood Johnson University Hospital
 Saint Barnabas Medical Center
 Robert Wood Johnson University Hospital

References

External links
 

Health care companies based in New Jersey
1929 establishments in New Jersey
Summit, New Jersey
Medical and health organizations based in New Jersey
Clinics in the United States
Announced mergers and acquisitions